The Milan Triennial VI was the Triennial in Milan sanctioned by the Bureau of International Expositions (BIE). Its theme was Continuity – Modernity. It was held at the Palazzo dell'Arte with some exhibits on the Parco Sempione and ran from 31 May 1936 - 1 November 1936.

Contents
Buildings included an open air theatre and a concrete and glass Housing Exhibit pavilion designed by Giuseppe Pagano assisted by Costantino Nivola.

Alvar Aalto (for Finland),
Georges Braque, 
Naum Gabo, 
Goncharova, 
Larionov, 
Le Corbusier (for France)
Léger
and 
Pablo Picasso all contributed, with Aalto winning both a Gran Prix and a gold medal.

References 

1936 in Italy
Tourist attractions in Milan
World's fairs in Milan